The 2008–09 Premier League of Bosnia and Herzegovina was the ninth season since its establishment and the seventh as a unified country-wide league. It started on 2 August 2008 and ended on 23 May 2009. Modriča were the defending champions.

Promotion and relegation
Jedinstvo Bihać and Žepče were relegated after the 2007–08 season due to finishing in 15th and 16th place, respectively.

They were replaced by the champions of two second-level leagues, Zvijezda Gradačac (Prva Liga BiH) and Borac Banja Luka (Prva Liga RS).

Clubs and stadia

League table

Results

Top goalscorers

References

External links
 bihsoccer.com 
 nfsbih.ba 

Premier League of Bosnia and Herzegovina seasons
1
Bosnia